Craigmillar is a locality in Alberta, Canada.

The community was named after Craigmillar, Scotland, the native home of an early postmaster.

References 

Localities in the Municipal District of Provost No. 52